American composer and pianist Frances Tarbox (February 4, 1874 – October 23, 1959) wrote one opera and several songs. Her name is sometimes seen as Frances Tarbos.

Tarbox was born in St. Paul, Minnesota to Emma and Jasper Billings Tarbox. She studied music in Paris and with Edward MacDowell. She lived in New York City from at least 1910 until her death. Baritone Louis Graveure performed her best-known song "The Joy of a Rose" frequently in his recitals.

Tarbox's music was published by Carl Fischer. In addition to an opera (title unknown), her compositions included:

Piano 

Valse Pavlova

Vocal 

"America Stand Forth" (text by Michel Justin; pseud of Julie C. Pruyn)

"Joy of a Rose"(text by A. L. Gruber)

"Relief from the New Deal" (text by Michel Justin; pseud of Julie C. Pruyn)

"What Them Fellows Does is Art"

"We've Found At Last a Candidate of Presidential Timber" (text by Michel Justin; pseud of Julie C. Pruyn)

References 

American women composers
American songwriters
1874 births
1959 deaths